John Ronan is an American ice hockey coach and former forward, who is currently an assistant coach for the Union Dutchmen.

Career
Ronan was a four-year player at Maine. As a two-way forward, he helped the Black Bears reach the championship game in 2004 and was lauded by his coach for inspiring the team to victory after finding themselves down 1–4 to Harvard. Ronan played professionally for several years, mostly in the lower North American leagues, but did spend a season in the Dutch Premier League shortly before his retirement.

Ronan returned to Maine to finish his degree in 2013 and then worked as a volunteer assistant at Union during the Dutchmen's national championship run. The following year he became a full time assistant in the USHL before returning to the college ranks and eventually wound up back at Union. He remained as an assistant under Rick Bennett until his former boss was suspended in January 2022 after allegations of improper coaching conduct. Ronan was made the interim head coach and remained in that position after Bennett's resignation a week later. Ronan led the team to an 8–8–1 finish.

After the season, Union decided to name Josh Hauge as the new head coach, however, Ronan was retained as an assistant with the Dutchmen.

Head coaching record

† mid-season replacement

References

External links

1980 births
Living people
American ice hockey coaches
American men's ice hockey forwards
Maine Black Bears men's ice hockey players
Alaska Aces (ECHL) players
Florida Everblades players
Rocky Mountain Rage players
Austin Ice Bats players
Huntsville Havoc players
Flint Generals players
Evansville IceMen players
Union Dutchmen ice hockey coaches